Joseph Meadows was a New Zealand rugby league player. He played 2 matches for New Zealand in 1921 become Kiwi number 149.

Playing career
Joseph Meadows played rugby league in Wellington prior to moving to Auckland. In 1920 he was representing the Athletic club in the Wellington club competition and during the year he also made the Wellington B team for a match against Watersiders.

In 1921 he moved to Auckland and began playing for the Ponsonby United club where he was to play for 2 seasons. In that same year he made the New Zealand team to tour Australia. His first game for New Zealand was against the Auckland side prior to the departure for Australia. New Zealand won the match by 22 points to 16 with Meadows playing in the forwards. During the tour of Australia 8 matches were played in total however Meadows only played in one of them. This was the match with Toowoomba on June 22 at Athletic Oval in Toowoomba. Meadows played at hooker in a 30–18 loss to the local side.

After returning from the tour he played for Auckland against King Country. Auckland won the match by 58 points to 25. This was to be his only appearance in an Auckland jersey.

He again turned out for Ponsonby in the 1922 season. Meadows scored his one and only try for Ponsonby in a round 2 win over Athletic where they won by 23 points to 5. Meadows was last mentioned in a Ponsonby team in a round 11 match in July. Following the 1922 season it is unclear if he continued to play rugby league.

References

New Zealand rugby league players
New Zealand national rugby league team players
Auckland rugby league team players
Ponsonby Ponies players
Rugby league hookers